The Sony Xperia 5 is an Android smartphone marketed and manufactured by Sony. Part of Sony's flagship Xperia series, it was unveiled at the annual IFA event on September 5, 2019. The device is a cheaper, more compact variant of the Xperia 1.

Design

The Xperia 5 heavily resembles the Xperia 1, but has a smaller form factor. Like the 1, it uses aluminum for the frame and Corning Gorilla Glass 6 for the screen and back panel. The button layout is retained, with the volume, power and shutter release buttons as well as the always-on fingerprint scanner all located on the right side of the phone. However, the card slot has been moved to the left side as opposed to the Xperia 1's top-mounted tray. Notably, the camera module, color sensing (RGBC-IR sensor) and LED flash have been relocated to the upper left-hand corner of the device as on earlier Xperia phones. The earpiece/top speaker, front-facing camera, notification LED and various sensors are housed in the top bezel. The bottom edge has the primary microphone and a downward-firing speaker next to the USB-C port. At 158 mm × 68 mm × 8.2 mm, the Xperia 5 is 9 mm shorter and 4 mm narrower than the 1, but has the same depth. The decrease in dimensions also results in the device being lighter at 164g (5.78 oz); it weighs 14g (0.5 oz) less than the 1. The same IP65/68 rating is present, and four colors are available: Blue, Red, Black and Grey.

Specifications

Hardware
The chipset is carried over from the 1, a Qualcomm Snapdragon 855 SoC and an Adreno 640 GPU, accompanied by 6 GB of LPDDR4X RAM. The Xperia 5 is only available with 128 GB of UFS internal storage, lacking the 64 GB model of the 1, and microSD expansion is supported up to 512 GB with a hybrid dual-SIM setup. The display is smaller and has a lower resolution than the Xperia 1, using a 6.1 in (155mm) 21:9 1080p (2520 × 1080) HDR OLED panel which results in a pixel density of 449 ppi. The camera system is similar to the Xperia 1 in terms of hardware (a 12 MP primary lens, a 12 MP telephoto lens and a 12 MP ultrawide lens with an 8 MP front camera), but is missing the 960fps slow motion capabilities due to lacking a stacked memory main sensor. However, Sony improved the Eye AF autofocus allowing it to work at 30fps. The battery is 6% smaller than the Xperia 1 due to the reduced physical footprint, with a 3140mAh cell which can be recharged at up to 18W via the USB-C 3.1 port. The 3.5mm audio jack is still absent, but an active external amplifier is still included; connectivity options mostly remain the same.

Software
The Xperia 5 runs on Android 9.0 "Pie", along with Smart Stamina battery saving modes and Sony's proprietary multimedia apps. It features an improved Side Sense. It works through a pair of touch-sensitive areas on either side of the phone. A tap or slide triggers various actions set by the user, most of which configurable including the sensitivity of the touch areas. Another feature by the Side Sense is Pair shortcut which, upon launch from the Side Sense window, will trigger a split-screen setup with the selected pair of user-customizable apps instantly. In December 2019, Sony began to release Android 10 for the Xperia 5.

References

External links 

 

Android (operating system) devices
Flagship smartphones
Sony smartphones
Mobile phones introduced in 2019
Mobile phones with multiple rear cameras
Mobile phones with 4K video recording
Discontinued flagship smartphones